Congestion is a 1918 silent film directed by Anatoli Dolinov, Donat Pashkovskiy and Aleksandr Panteleyev.

Plot 
In the apartment of a professor, a locksmith is placed with his daughter, after which the apartment is visited by various factory workers and the professor decides to start lecturing in the working club. The younger son falls in love with the worker's daughter and they decide to get married. The elder son of the professor is not satisfied with the new tenants of the apartment and he is arrested.

Starring 
 Ivan Lersky as Pulnikov
 Dmitry Leshchenko as Khrustin

References

External links 

1918 films
1910s Russian-language films
Russian silent films
Russian black-and-white films